The Corpus Scriptorum Ecclesiasticorum Latinorum (CSEL) is an academic series that publishes critical editions of Latin works by late-antique Christian authors.

Description 
The CSEL publishes Latin writings of Christian authors from the time of the late 2nd century (Tertullian) until the beginning of the 8th century (Bede the Venerable, †735). Each text is edited on the basis of all (or the most important of all) the extant manuscripts according to modern editorial techniques, in order to produce a text as close as possible to the original. Each volume includes an introduction, in which the principles of the preparation of the text are explained. 
Some editions are prepared by the staff of the CSEL, others by external, internationally renowned experts; the volumes are published after a positive evaluation by an international advisory board: De Gruyter (prior to 2012: Verlag der Österreichischen Akademie der Wissenschaften). The CSEL also runs the online database Edenda, where CSEL editions as well as editing projects by others are publicly announced.
In addition, the CSEL publishes special catalogues for the large extant corpus of medieval manuscripts containing works of Augustine or ascribed to him ("Die handschriftliche Überlieferung der Werke des heiligen Augustinus"), in order to make time-consuming research in this field easier. In addition, monographs on topics related to the Latin patristic period and conference proceedings are published at irregular intervals ("CSEL Extra seriem").

History 
The CSEL was founded in 1864 by the Imperial Academy of Sciences in Vienna (Österreichische Akademie der Wissenschaften) in order to produce critical editions of Latin patristic texts – editions that were meant to facilitate the lexicographical work of the Thesaurus linguae Latinae (at that time still in the planning stages). Before the year 2012 the CSEL was edited by the “Kommission zur Herausgabe des Corpus der lateinischen Kirchenväter” (“Kirchenväterkommission”) of the Austrian Academy of Sciences. The chairmen of this commission were:
 1864–1874: Johannes Vahlen
 1875–1891: Franz von Miklosich
 1891–1907: Wilhelm von Hartel
 1907–1916: Wilhelm Meyer-Lübke
 1916–1941: Edmund Hauler
 1941–1963: Richard Meister
 1964–1982: Rudolf Hanslik
 1982–1991: Herbert Hunger
 1991–2001: Adolf Primmer
 2001–2012: Kurt Smolak
After the commission was transferred to the University of Salzburg in 2012, the CSEL became part of the Department of Ancient Studies / Latin at the University of Salzburg.

Evaluation
The series currently consists of about 100 volumes, some with multiple sub-volumes. These volumes have replaced about a third of J. P. Migne's Patrologia Latina, which do not offer critical editions. Some CSEL volumes have themselves been replaced by more recent critical editions (e.g., Corpus Christianorum Series Latina, Sources chrétiennes, Bibliothèque augustinienne), but about two-thirds of them are still considered authoritative standard editions; in fact, the CSEL edition often remains the only critical edition of a given text.
In the course of work on the manuscript catalogues as well as on the preparation of CSEL editions, patristic texts which were previously thought lost have been recovered: e.g., the writings of the Spanish heretic Priscillian, the commentary on Revelation by Victorinus of Pettau, 29 unknown letters of Augustine ("Epistulae Divjak"), six of Augustine's sermons ("Sermones Erfurt"), and the full text of the commentary on the gospels by Fortunatianus of Aquileia (mid-4th century; edition published 2017). Numerous volumes of the CSEL were incorporated into the digital Library of Latin Texts (LLT).

Literature 
 Rudolf Hanslik, 100 Jahre Corpus Scriptorum Ecclesiasticorum Latinorum, in: Anzeiger der philosophisch-historischen Klasse der Österreichischen Akademie der Wissenschaften 101 (1964), 21–35.
 Michaela Zelzer, Ein Jahrhundert (und mehr) CSEL. Evaluation von Ziel und Veröffentlichungen, Sacris Erudiri 38 (1998), 75–99.
 Dorothea Weber, 150 Jahre Corpus Scriptorum Ecclesiasticorum Latinorum, in: Edition und Erforschung lateinischer patristischer Texte. 150 Jahre CSEL (FS Kurt Smolak), herausgegeben von Victoria Zimmerl-Panagl, Lukas J. Dorfbauer, Clemens Weidmann, Berlin 2014, IX-XI.

References

External links
CSEL (official page, including a list of volumes and authors).
Alternate official site
Links to vol. 1-55 on archive.org (with direct links to each text).
List of CSEL volumes at Google Books.
Most of the early volumes are available on Google books, here is a list.
More information on 4th century Christianity.
An open source XML version of CSEL public domain volumes has been made available by the Open Greek and Latin Project at the University of Leipzig.

Series of books
Publications of patristic texts